Mehrabad Rural District may refer to:

Mehrabad Rural District (Damavand County), Tehran province
Mehrabad Rural District (Abarkuh County), Yazd province